Fernando María Castiella y Maíz (1907–1976) was a Spanish diplomat and politician, who served as Minister of Foreign Affairs (1957–1969) in Francoist Spain.

Biography 
Born in Bilbao on 9 December 1907.

He read Law and held a Doctorate from the University of Madrid. He also undertook postdoctoral specialisation at the Universities of Paris, Cambridge and Geneva and at The Hague Academy of International Law. He was appointed Catedrático of Public International Law at the University of Madrid in 1935. A Spanish Confederation of the Autonomous Right activist during the Second Republic, he often wrote in El Debate about international issues and was vice-president of the Catholic Students' Confederation.

When the Civil War started he fled from Madrid to the Nationalist zone, joining the Nationalist Army as official of the General Staff. During the Second World War he joined the Blue Division, a unit of Spanish volunteers that served in the Wehrmacht on the Eastern Front. With José María de Areilza, and wrote Reivindicaciones de España (Madrid: Instituto de Estudios Políticos, 1941), that drafted an expansionist programme over French African colonies. The book was written at the height of the Third Reich's power and Franco had considered entering war on Hitler's side.

He promoted the establishment of the Faculty of Political Science and Economics of the University of Madrid and he was the first dean. He was appointed ambassador to Peru (1948-1951) and to the Holy See (1951-1957), where he negotiated the Concordat of 1953.

Franco appointed him minister of Foreign Affairs on February 25, 1957. He set out to improve the relationship with the Western world. He tried with no success to become member of NATO and associate member of the European Common Market. He also tried to improve the terms of the defence and cooperation appointments with the United States but also with little success. He succeed, nevertheless, to be one of the co-founder countries of the Organisation for Economic Co-operation and Development (1961). Politically moderate aperturist, in 1961, he wrote a draft bill of religious freedom, although it was not passed until 1967. He tried vehemently to see the return of Gibraltar to Spanish sovereignty claiming the case was eligible for a decolonization process. He had for some decades ago written a book on Gibraltar on a such issue, but was  nonetheless unsuccessful in his endeavours. After his tenure as minister, he taught Private International Law to Ph.D. students at the Complutense University in Madrid.

He died in Madrid on 25 November 1976.

Works 

Authored works
 
Co-authored works

Bibliography 
Manuel Espadas: Franquismo y política exterior, Madrid: Rialp, 1988
Javier Tusell; Juan Avilés, Rosa Pardo: La política exterior de España en el siglo XX, Madrid: Universidad Nacional de Educación a Distancia; Biblioteca Nueva, 2000
Marcelino Oreja Aguirre; Rafael Sánchez Mantero: Entre la Historia y la Memoria, Fernando Maria Castiella y la Politica Exterior de España (1957-1969), written on the occasion of the centenary of his birth. Edited by the Royal Academy of Moral and Political Sciences, Madrid 2007.

1907 births
1976 deaths
People from Bilbao
Complutense University of Madrid alumni
University of Paris alumni
Alumni of the University of Cambridge
University of Geneva alumni
The Hague Academy of International Law people
Foreign relations of Spain during the Francoist dictatorship
Foreign ministers of Spain
Ambassadors of Spain to Peru
Ambassadors of Spain to the Holy See
Grand Crosses 1st class of the Order of Merit of the Federal Republic of Germany
Government ministers during the Francoist dictatorship
Spanish expatriates in France
Spanish expatriates in the United Kingdom
Spanish expatriates in Switzerland